The 2013 FC Dallas season is the eighteenth of the team's existence. The team began their preseason by signing three new players to the squad: Stephen Keel, Peter Luccin, and Pipico.

Club

Coaching staff

Stadiums

Players

Out on loan

Pre-season and friendlies

Competitions

Overview

Major League Soccer

Overall standings

Standings
Western Conference

Results summary

Results by round

Matches

U.S. Open Cup

Statistics

Goals

Assists

Goalkeeping

FC Dallas Reserves

Matches

Reserve League Statistics

Goals

Assists

References

http://www.fcdallas.com/news/2013/03/match-recap-fc-dallas-1-colorado-rapids-0

FC Dallas seasons
Dallas
Dallas
FC Dallas season